Slobodan "Čile" Mišković (12 December 1944 – 4 July 1997) was a Serbian handball coach and player who competed for Yugoslavia in the 1972 Summer Olympics.

Club career
Mišković started out at Crvenka, making his senior debut in 1962. He was a member of the team that qualified for the Yugoslav Championship for the first time ever in 1965. Later on, Mišković helped them win their first trophy, the Yugoslav Cup, in 1967 and their first Yugoslav Championship title in 1969.

International career
At international level, Mišković represented Yugoslavia between 1967 and 1974. He was a member of the team that won the gold medal at the 1972 Summer Olympics in Munich. In his last appearance at a major tournament, the 1974 World Championship in East Germany, Mišković helped the team win the bronze medal.

Coaching career
From 1975 to 1977, Mišković played for and served as head coach of Sloga Doboj. He subsequently coached Celje, before returning to his mother club Crvenka in 1983. Between 1985 and 1990, Mišković served as head coach of Proleter Zrenjanin, winning the Yugoslav Championship in 1989–90.

Honours

Player
Crvenka
 Yugoslav Handball Championship: 1968–69
 Yugoslav Handball Cup: 1966–67

Coach
Proleter Zrenjanin
 Yugoslav Handball Championship: 1989–90

References

External links
 Olympic record
 

1944 births
1997 deaths
Serbian male handball players
Yugoslav male handball players
Olympic handball players of Yugoslavia
Olympic gold medalists for Yugoslavia
Handball players at the 1972 Summer Olympics
Olympic medalists in handball
Medalists at the 1972 Summer Olympics
RK Crvenka players
Serbian handball coaches
Yugoslav handball coaches